Mariobezziinae is a subfamily of bee flies in the family Bombyliidae. There are about 10 genera and at least 50 described species in Mariobezziinae.

Genera
These 10 genera belong to the subfamily Mariobezziinae:
 Callynthrophora Schiner, 1868 c g
 Corsomyza Wiedemann, 1820 c g
 Dasypalpus Macquart, 1840 c g
 Gnumyia Bezzi, 1921 c g
 Hyperusia Bezzi, 1921 c g
 Mariobezzia Becker, 1912 c g
 Megapalpus Macquart, 1834 c g
 Pusilla Paramonov, 1954 c g
 Zyxmyia Bowden, 1960 c g
 † Paracorsomyza Hennig, 1966
Data sources: i = ITIS, c = Catalogue of Life, g = GBIF, b = Bugguide.net

References

Further reading

 
 
 

Bombyliidae